Jason James Jacome (born November 24, 1970) is a former professional baseball pitcher from 1994 to 1998 for the New York Mets, Kansas City Royals, and Cleveland Indians. He also pitched two seasons in Japan for the Yakult Swallows in 1999 and 2000.

External links

1970 births
Living people
Acereros de Monclova players
American expatriate baseball players in Japan
American expatriate baseball players in Mexico
Atlantic City Surf players
Baseball players from Oklahoma
Binghamton Mets players
Buffalo Bisons (minor league) players
Cleveland Indians players
Fresno Grizzlies players
Kansas City Royals players
Kingsport Mets players
Major League Baseball pitchers
Memphis Redbirds players
Mexican League baseball pitchers
New York Mets players
Nippon Professional Baseball pitchers
Norfolk Tides players
St. Lucie Mets players
Tucson Sidewinders players
Tucson Toros players
Yakult Swallows players